Sable FC may refer to:

 Sable FC (Cameroon), a Cameroonian football club
 Sablé FC (France), a French football club